The Last Days of Chez Nous is a 1992 Australian drama film directed by Gillian Armstrong and written by Helen Garner. Made in a style that emphasizes naturalism over melodrama, the film centres on what happens after Vicki arrives at the house of her older sister Beth, whose French husband falls for her. The film stars Bruno Ganz as the Frenchman JP, New Zealand actor Kerry Fox as the impulsive younger sister, and Lisa Harrow as her older sibling. The cast also includes Miranda Otto and Bill Hunter.

Plot

Cast
 Lisa Harrow as Beth
 Bruno Ganz as J.P.
 Kerry Fox as Vicki
 Miranda Otto as Annie
 Kiri Paramore as Tim
 Bill Hunter as Beth's Father
 Lex Marinos as Angelo
 Mickey Camilleri as Sally
 Lynne Murphy as Beth's Mother
 Claire Haywood as Janet
 Leanne Bundy as Susie
 Wilson Alcorn as Cafe Dero

Production
Helen Garner had written her first script for Jan Chapman, 2 Friends. The two of them worked on the idea of Chez Nous for a number of years before developing it into a screenplay. Chapman then approached Gillian Armstrong who said:
I really loved it because I love Helen's writing. I think she has incredibly acute observation of people and wonderful poetry in her writing. I did think the biggest challenge was that so much was in one house, but I took that on board and thought, well, we'll just have to do everything possible to make people still feel they're watching a movie. After all, the house is also a character in the story.

The film was entirely funded by the Film Fund of the Film Finance Corporation. Armstrong made the movie straight after Fires Within and enjoyed it much more because the Hollywood film had been such a bad experience.

Release and reception
The film opened in Melbourne on 8 October 1992 at Greater Union Pitt Centre, Academy Twin and GU Mosman, and the same day in Melbourne at Village Rivoli Twin and Forest Hill Showcase. Lisa Harrow won the Australian Film Institute Award for Best Actress in a Leading Role, and the film was nominated for the AFI's Best Picture award. The film was entered into the 42nd Berlin International Film Festival.

The film held a 83% "Fresh" rating on Rotten Tomatoes as of October 2019, based on 12 reviews.

The Last Days of Chez Nous grossed $1,018,866 at the box office in Australia. Commercially, it was the most successful of the Film Finance Fund's "Chook Raffle" slate of five films.

See also
Cinema of Australia

References

External links 

 
The Last Days of Chez Nous at the National Film and Sound Archive
The Last Days of Chez Nous at Ozmovies
 

1992 films
1992 drama films
Australian drama films
Australian independent films
Films directed by Gillian Armstrong
1992 independent films
1990s English-language films